Walther Schoenichen (July 18, 1876 in Cologne – November 22, 1956 in Göppingen) was a German biologist and a prominent proponent of nature conservation within Nazi Germany.

Schoenichen studied natural sciences in Halle and obtained his doctorate in 1898. From 1898 to 1913, he worked as a teacher.

In 1942, he published his magnum opus,  (Nature Conservation as a National and International Cultural Task).

Schoenichen was an antisemite for much of his career, writing in 1926 that "[the German] people face a decline in racial hygiene", and described advertising billboards as an "infection with Jewish toxin."

In 1948, three years after the Second World War, Schoenichen moved to Goslar. From 1949 until his death, he was a professor at the Technical University of Braunschweig.

Publications 

 , Sammlung naturwissenschaftlich-pädagogischer Abhandlungen (Band 1, Heft 3), Leipzig und Berlin 1903
 , Velhagen & Klasings Volksbücher Nr. 50, Bielefeld und Leipzig (1912?)
 , Velhagen & Klasings Volksbücher Nr. 87, Bielefeld und Leipzig 1913
 In collaboration with Max Popp: , Leipzig 1917
 , Jena 1918 (3., erweiterte Auflage 1930)
 , Leipzig 1918
 , Leipzig 1919
 , Leipzig 1920
 , Leipzig 1922
 In collaboration with other authors: , Jena 1922
 , Freiburg im Breisgau 1923
 , Biologische Studienbücher (Band 2), Freiburg im Breisgau 1924
 , Wege zum Wissen 4, Berlin 1924
 , Berlin 1925
 , Naturschutz-Bücherei (Band 1), Berlin-Lichterfelde 1925
 In collaboration with other authors: , München 1926
 In collaboration with Philipp Depdolla: , Handbuch des naturwissenschaftlichen und mathematischen Unterrichts (Band 5), Leipzig 1926 [Ausg. 1925]
 , Naturschutz-Bücherei (Band 8), Berlin-Lichterfelde 1928
 , Langensalza 1928 (2. Auflage Berlin/Leipzig 1929)
 , Handbuch der Deutschkunde (Band 7), Frankfurt am Main 1928
 , Naturschutz-Bücherei (Band 11), Berlin-Lichterfelde 1929 (3. Auflage 1951)
 , Handweiser der Staatlichen Stelle für Naturdenkmalpflege in Preußen (Band 1), Neudamm 1931
  In:  (14. Jahrgang, Heft 11), Neudamm und Berlin 1933
 , Jena 1933
 , Neudamm 1934
 , Naturschutz-Bücherei (Band 12), Berlin 1934
 , Neudamm 1935
 , 2 Bände, 1935 und 1937
 In collaboration with Werner Weber: , Berlin 1936
 , Neudamm und Berlin 1937
 In collaboration with Erich Schröder (Zeichnungen): , Berlin-Lichterfelde 1938 (2., erweiterte und verbesserte Auflage 1941)
 In collaboration with Erich Schröder (Zeichnungen) et al.: , Berlin-Lichterfelde 1938
 , Landschaftsschutz und Landschaftspflege (Heft 3), Neudamm und Berlin 1939
 , Jena 1940
 , Jena 1942
 , Berlin-Halensee und Bielefeld 1947
 , Berlin-Halensee 1947
 , Berlin-Halensee 1949
 , Berlin 1950
 , Stuttgart/Ludwigsburg 1950
 , Berlin 1951
 , 2 Hefte, Kiel 1951 und 1954
 , Hannover 1952
 , Große Naturforscher (Band 16), Stuttgart 1954

References

External links 

  (German)

Conservationists
1876 births
1956 deaths
Nazi Party members